Thomas Clements (3 February 1916 – 15 November 1995) was an Irish clergyman who served as the Dean of Clogher from 1966 until 1982.

Clements was born in Cloghan, County Offaly on 3 February 1916. He was educated at Trinity College, Dublin, and ordained in 1940. After  curacies in Belfast, Ballymachugh and Mullaghdun he held  incumbencies at Finner and Enniskillen until his time as dean.

Clements regularly travelled to the United States to give sermons. In 1981, he gave a sermon in New York and discussed The Troubles. He died there on 15 November 1995, at the age of 79.

References

1916 births
1995 deaths
Alumni of Trinity College Dublin
Deans of Clogher
Irish Anglicans